Numerous non-native plants have been introduced to Texas in the United States and many of them have become invasive species. The following is a list of some non-native invasive plant species established in Texas.

Aquatic plants

Terrestrial plants

Aquatic animals

Terrestrial animals

Insects

Pathogens

See also
Invasive species in the United States
Animal and Plant Health Inspection Service
North Texas Invasive Species Barrier Act of 2014

References

External links 
Texas Invasives
Texas Invasive Species Institute
Texas A&M Forest Service
Texas Parks and Wildlife
Southern Regional Extension Forestry
PlayCleanGo
Texas Oak Wilt
Don't Move Firewood

Invasive species in the United States
Texas
Invasive species